Hyrcania or Hyrkania may refer to :

Geography
Hyrcania, a historical region south-east of the Caspian Sea in modern-day Iran
Hyrcanian civilization
Hyrcanian Ocean, the Caspian sea
Hyrcania (fortress), a fortress in the West Bank
Hyrcania (Lydia), a town of ancient Lydia

Fictional geography
Hyrkania (Conan), a fictional location in Robert E. Howard's Conan mythos
Hyrkania, a fictional location in  Marvel Comic's Red Sonja mythos

See also
 Hercynia (disambiguation)